Ömer Çatkıç (born 15 October 1974 in Eskişehir) is a Turkish former professional footballer who played as a goalkeeper. His last club was Antalyaspor in the Turkish Süper Lig.

He played for Eskişehirspor, Gaziantepspor, Gençlerbirliği, and Bursaspor. He returned to Gaziantepspor in the 2007–08 season.

He represented the Turkey national team and was a participant at the Euro 2000, 2002 FIFA World Cup and 2003 FIFA Confederations Cup.

Prosecution
In the aftermath of the attempted coup d'etat of July 2016 he was accused of being involved in the Gülen movement. In January 2020 Çatkiç was sentenced to two years and three months imprisonment for being a member of an armed terror organization due to his links to the Gülen movement.

Honours
Turkey
FIFA World Cup: third place 2002
FIFA Confederations Cup: third place 2003

References

External links
 
 

1974 births
Living people
People from Eskişehir
Turkish people of Bosniak descent
Turkish footballers
Eskişehirspor footballers
Bursaspor footballers
Gaziantepspor footballers
Gençlerbirliği S.K. footballers
Antalyaspor footballers
Association football goalkeepers
UEFA Euro 2000 players
2002 FIFA World Cup players
2003 FIFA Confederations Cup players
Turkey international footballers
Süper Lig players
Turkish prisoners and detainees